Krishnan K. T. Nagarajan, commonly known as Krishna, N. Krishna, and Obeli N. Krishna, is an Indian film director and screenwriter, from the Tamil film industry.  He made his directorial debut with the 2006 romantic drama, Sillunu Oru Kaadhal.

Career
Krishna started his film career in Tamil film industry, with Gautham Vasudev Menon. He was the associate director in Minnale and it's Hindi remake, Rehnaa Hai Terre Dil Mein. He was also the co-director for Kaakha Kaakha and it's Telugu remake, Gharshana.

Krishna made his directorial debut with the romantic film Sillunu Oru Kaadhal. It starred Suriya, Bhumika Chawla and Jyothika in pivotal roles, while Shriya Sharma, Sukanya, Vadivelu and Santhanam played other pivotal roles. The film's score and soundtrack were composed by A. R. Rahman, with lyrics by the Indian poet, Vaali. The cinematography for the film was handled by R. D. Rajasekhar, while the editing was handled by Gautham Menon's regular, Anthony. The film was released on 8 September 2006, three days before the marriage of Suriya and Jyothika.

Krishna's second film,Yen Ippadi Mayakkinai which stars Richard Rishi and Gayathrie was completed and never hit the screens due after the production company Pyramid Saimira filed for bankruptcy.  Music was scored by the debutant music director C. Sathya. 

Krishna returned to direction, in 2012, with the realistic film, Nedunchaalai, a period drama set in the 1980s. The film was announced in February 2012. It starred Aari with Sshivada in lead roles. Prashant Narayanan was signed on to play a pivotal role in the film, as was supporting actor, Thambi Ramiah. The film's score and soundtrack were composed by C. Sathya. The cinematography for the film was handled by Rajavel Olhiveeran, while it was edited by the late-Kishore Te. Udhayanidhi Stalin's Red Giant Movies, acquired the distribution rights for the film, after being impressed in a private screening, in December 2013. After a long delay, the film released on 28 March 2014. It opened to generally positive reviews, by the critics and audience, alike. It ended up as a critical and commercial success. Krishna's next directorial was Maane Thene Peye. However, it was shelved, due to unknown reasons. 

His next directorial, Pathu Thala, is the official adaptation of Mufti. Initially, it was supposed to be directed by Narthan, who directed the original in Kannada, but due to unknown reasons, he was replaced by Krishna. It stars Silambarasan, Gautham Karthick, and Priya Bhavani Shankar in lead roles. The music is composed by A. R. Rahman, in his second collaboration with Krishna, after Sillunu Oru Kaadhal.

Filmography

As a director

As an actor

References

External links 
 

Indian film directors
Tamil film directors
People from Namakkal district
Living people
Year of birth missing (living people)
21st-century Indian film directors
Film directors from Tamil Nadu